High & Dry is a British television sitcom created by Marc Wootton for Channel 4. The series is about a plane crash in the Indian Ocean, where five people from the flight find themselves stranded together on a remote island. Although four of the survivors are desperate to be found and rescued, mentally unstable steward Brett Sullivan has other fantasies to play out. He secretly sabotages all attempts to escape the island but his madness becomes more apparent to the survivors over time.

Development 
Wootton has said that he came up with the character of Brett based on a real experience he had with a clingy air steward on a long-haul flight. The steward recognised him from TV and upgraded him to first class, but then spent the entire journey trying to befriend him and even asked for his phone number… which Marc gave to him with one digit changed. When they received a full commission, "Our producer Kerry Waddell started a global search (for locations having authenticity of an Indian Ocean paradise spot). The Seychelles rose to the top of the pack and in conjunction with a UK-based fixing firm, we travelled to recce and meet with the government officials to gain permission to shoot there".

References

External links

2018 British television series debuts
2010s British sitcoms
English-language television shows
Fictional works set in the Indian Ocean
Television shows set on islands